The Ringgold County Courthouse in Mount Ayr, Iowa, United States, was built in 1927. It was listed on the National Register of Historic Places in 1981 as a part of the County Courthouses in Iowa Thematic Resource. The courthouse is the fourth building the county has used for court functions and county administration.

History
The first Ringgold County courthouse was a log structure constructed in 1856. It was destroyed in a tornado two years later, and the logs were salvaged for use in a new house. A frame building was constructed for the second courthouse and the county paid $3,500 to have it built. It was two stories and measured . The third courthouse was under construction when it was destroyed in a fire on Thanksgiving Day 1889. The new courthouse was a brick and stone building that was built for $36,455. The 2½-story structure  measured  and had a central tower that rose . That building was condemned in 1921. It was given, along with $500 to a house wrecker to be torn down. Voters approved a new courthouse in 1926. The three-story brick building measures  and was built at a cost of $132,533. It was designed by the Des Moines architectural firm of Keffer & Jones and built by the L.T. Grisman Company.

Architecture
The courthouse is considered a "budget classical" building by which the structure's Beaux-Arts and Neoclassical design elements are stripped to a minimal form. The building becomes more utilitarian than imaginatively expressed. The three-story building is composed of red brick and concrete. Stone trim runs horizontally between the first and second floors and above the third floor where there is also a projecting stone cornice. The building is capped with a flat roof. The significance of the courthouse is derived from its association with county government, and the political power and prestige of Mount Ayr as the county seat.

See also
The former Ringgold County Jail is also listed on the National Register of Historic Places.

References

Government buildings completed in 1927
Neoclassical architecture in Iowa
Buildings and structures in Ringgold County, Iowa
National Register of Historic Places in Ringgold County, Iowa
Courthouses on the National Register of Historic Places in Iowa
County courthouses in Iowa